Lygephila salax is a moth of the  family Erebidae.

Distribution
It is found in Africa, where it is known from South Africa, Sierra Leone, and Réunion.

Its wingspan is 32–36 mm.

References

External links
 Genitalia images have been published in ESPERIANA, 2006, Bd. 12: 145, fig.24.
 Africanmoths: Images & Distribution map

Calpinae
Moths described in 1852
Moths of Réunion
Moths of Sub-Saharan Africa